Songs of Joy and Peace is a Christmas music album by cellist Yo-Yo Ma, released on October 14, 2008. The album won the 2010 Grammy Award for Best Classical Crossover Album. It features collaborations with many other artists, including vocalists Diana Krall & Alison Krauss, bassist John Clayton, pianist Dave Brubeck, cellist Matt Brubeck, clarinetist Paquito D'Rivera, trumpeter Chris Botti, pianist Billy Childs, bassist Robert Hurst, drummer Billy Kilson, and guitarist Romero Lubambo, bassist Edgar Meyer, bassist Nilson Matta, mandolinist Chris Thile, vocalist Renée Fleming, Celtic fiddler Natalie MacMaster, harpist Marta Cook, saxophonist Joshua Redman, piper Cristina Pato, vocalist James Taylor, the Assad Family, ukulele virtuoso Jake Shimabukuro, and Wu Tong & the Silk Road Ensemble.

Track listing
All tracks traditional except where noted.
Dona Nobis Pacem (Give Us Peace) – 2:00
You Couldn't Be Cuter (Dorothy Fields/Jerome Kern) (with Diana Krall) – 3:28
Joy to the World 3:42
Here Comes the Sun (George Harrison) – 2:50
Improvisation on Dona Nobis Pacem (Edgar Meyer/Chris Thile) – 2:57
The Wassail Song / All Through the Night – 2:37
A Christmas Jig/Mouth of the Tobique Reel – 3:46
The Wexford Carol – 4:20
Panxoliña: A Galician Carol – 3:05
Improvisation on Dona Nobis Pacem (Sérgio Assad/Odair Assad) – 0:58
Vassourinhas (Matias da Rocha) – 3:25
Improvisation on Dona Nobis Pacem (Paquito D'Rivera/Alon Yavnai) – 2:32
Invitación al Danzón 	(Paquito D'Rivera) – 4:53
My One and Only Love (Robert Mellin/Guy Wood) – 4:07
Familia  (Sérgio Assad/Odair Assad) – 3:57
Concordia (Dave Brubeck) – 4:30
My Favorite Things (Rodgers and Hammerstein) – 6:29
Touch the Hand of Love (Blossom Dearie) – 4:35
Kuai Le (Osvaldo Golijov) – 3:26
This Little Light of Mine (with Amelia Zirin-Brown) – 5:02
Happy Xmas (War is Over) (John Lennon/Yoko Ono) – 4:45
Dona Nobis Pacem/Auld Lang Syne – 1:57

Charts

Weekly charts

Year-end charts

References

Yo-Yo Ma albums
2008 classical albums
2008 Christmas albums
Christmas albums by American artists
Classical Christmas albums